Downpour (translit. Ragbār) is a 1972 black and white movie directed by Bahram Bayzai.

Cast
 Parviz Fannizadeh – Hekmati
 Parvaneh Massoumi – Atefeh
 Mohammad-Ali Keshavarz – Nazem
 Manuchehr Farid – Rahim

About the film 
Although the film circulated in various VHS and digital formats, mostly in poor quality, the only known surviving original copy of the film was a positive print with English subtitles in possession of the film maker; badly damaged with scratches, perforation tears and mid-frame splices. Restoration required a considerable amount of both physical and digital repair.

Restored in 2011 by Cineteca di Bologna/L'Immagine Ritrovata laboratory, in association with The Film Foundation's World Cinema Project and Bahram Beyzai, the film drew quite some international attention and was shown in Italy and the US. Martin Scorsese remarked: 

And Bahram Beyzai noted about his revisionist attitude that,

References

External links

Downpour: Furtive Glances an essay by Hamid Naficy at the Criterion Collection

1971 films
1970s Persian-language films
1971 drama films
Films directed by Bahram Bayzai
Films with screenplays by Bahram Beyzai
Iranian black-and-white films
Iranian drama films
1972 drama films
1972 films